The 25th district of the Czech Senate consists primarily of Prague 6. The current senator is Jiří Růžička.

Senators

Elections

1996

1998

2004

2010

2016 election
2016 election election was held as part of 2016 Czech Senate election. It was considered the most closely watched district in 2016. Jiří Růžička defeated Social democratic candidate Václav Bělohradský. Incumbent senator Petr Bratský didn't run. Other candidates included former dissident František Stárek, a dancer Vlastimil Harapes and former Chairman of Sazka Aleš Hušák.

References

25
Prague 6
Elections in Prague